This is a list of the best selling singles, albums and as according to IRMA. Further listings can be found here.

Top-selling singles
"Uptown Funk!" – Mark Ronson featuring Bruno Mars
"Cheerleader" – OMI
"Lean On" – Major Lazer featuring DJ Snake & MØ
"Thinking Out Loud" – Ed Sheeran
"See You Again" – Wiz Khalifa featuring Charlie Puth
"Love Me like You Do" – Ellie Goulding
"Hello" – Adele
"Shut Up and Dance" – Walk the Moon
"What Do You Mean?" – Justin Bieber
"Firestone" – Kygo featuring Conrad Sewell

Top-selling albums*
25 – Adele
x – Ed Sheeran
Hozier – Hozier 
Purpose – Justin Bieber
In the Lonely Hour – Sam Smith
1989 – Taylor Swift
Coming Up for Air – Kodaline
Beautiful Life At Christmas – Nathan Carter 
Made in the A.M. – One Direction
If I Can Dream - Elvis Presley

Notes:
 *Compilation albums are not included.

References 

2015 in Irish music
2015